R Lawmnasangzuala (born 13 December 2004) is an Indian footballer who plays as a forward or winger for Sudeva Delhi in the I-League.

Career statistics

Club

References

2004 births
Living people
Footballers from Mizoram
Indian footballers
Association football midfielders
I-League players
Sudeva Delhi FC players